The École polytechnique fédérale de Lausanne (EPFL), also known as the Swiss Federal Institute of Technology Lausanne, is a public research university in Lausanne, Switzerland. Specializing in natural sciences and engineering, it is one of the two Swiss Federal Institutes of Technology. 

EPFL is part of the Domain of the Swiss Federal Institutes of Technology (ETH Domain), which is directly dependent on the Federal Department of Economic Affairs, Education and Research. In connection with research and teaching activities, EPFL operates a nuclear reactor CROCUS, a tokamak fusion reactor TCV, a Blue Gene/Q Supercomputer and P3 bio-hazard facilities.

History 

The roots of modern-day EPFL can be traced back to the foundation of a private school under the name École spéciale de Lausanne in 1853 at the initiative of Lois Rivier, a graduate of the École Centrale Paris and John Gay, the then professor and rector of the Académie de Lausanne. At its inception it had only 11 students and the offices was located at Rue du Valentin in Lausanne. In 1869, it became the technical department of the public Académie de Lausanne. When the Académie was reorganised and acquired the status of a university in 1890, the technical faculty changed its name to École d'ingénieurs de l'Université de Lausanne. In 1946, it was renamed the École polytechnique de l'Université de Lausanne (EPUL). In 1969, the EPUL was separated from the rest of the University of Lausanne and became a federal institute under its current name. EPFL, like ETH Zurich, is thus directly controlled by the Swiss federal government. In contrast, all other universities in Switzerland are controlled by their respective cantonal governments. Following the nomination of Patrick Aebischer as president in 2000, EPFL has started to develop into the field of life sciences. It absorbed the Swiss Institute for Experimental Cancer Research (ISREC) in 2008.

In 1946, there were 360 students. In 1969, EPFL had 1,400 students and 55 professors. In the past two decades the university has grown rapidly and as of 2012 roughly 14,000 people study or work on campus, about 9,300 of these being Bachelor, Master or PhD students.   The environment at modern day EPFL is highly international with the school  attracting  students and researchers from all over the world. More than 125 countries are represented on the campus and the university has two official languages, French and English.

Admission and education 

Like every public university in Switzerland, EPFL is obliged to grant admission to every Swiss resident who took the maturité high-school certificate recognized by the Swiss Confederation. However, international students are required to have a final grade average of 80% or above of the maximum grade of the upper secondary school national system. As such, for Swiss students, EPFL is not selective in its undergraduate admission procedures.The real selection process happens during the first year of study. This period is called the propaedeutic cycle and the students must pass a block examination of all the courses taken during the first year at the end of the cycle. If the weighted average is insufficient, a student is required to retake the entire first year of coursework if they wish to continue their studies at the school. Roughly 50% of students fail the first year of study, and many choose to drop out rather than repeat the first year. The failure rate for the  cycle differs between fields, it is highest for Life Science, Physics and Electrical Engineering  where only 30–40% of students pass the first year.

For foreign students, the selection procedure towards the undergraduate program is rather strict, and since most undergraduate courses are taught in French, foreign students must provide documentation of having acquired a level B2 proficiency as measured on the CEF scale, though C1 proficiency is recommended.

As at all universities in Switzerland, the academic year is divided into two semesters. The usual time till graduation is six semesters for the Bachelor of Science degree and four additional semesters for the Master of Science degree. Though only 58% of the students who manage to graduate are able to graduate within this time-period. The possibility to study abroad for one or two semesters is offered during the 3rd year of study as EPFL maintains several long-standing student exchange programs, such as the junior year engineering and science program with Carnegie Mellon University in the United States, as well as a graduate Aeronautics and Aerospace program with the ISAE in France. The final semester is dedicated to writing a thesis.

Entrepreneurship is actively encouraged, as evident by the EPFL Innovation Park being an integral part of campus. Since 1997, 12 start-ups have been created per year on average by EPFL students and faculty. In the year 2013, a total of 105 million CHF was raised by EPFL start-ups.

Rankings  

The QS World University Rankings ranks EPFL 14th in the world across all fields in their 2020/2021 ranking, whilst Times Higher Education World University Rankings ranks EPFL as the world's 19th best school for Engineering and Technology in 2020.

EPFL typically scores high on faculty to student ratio, international outlook and scientific impact. The CWTS Leiden Ranking that "aims to provide highly accurate measurements of the scientific impact of universities" ranks EPFL world 13th, and 1st in Europe in the 2013 rankings for all the sciences. 
 
Although EPFL generally ranks well on measures such as citation index, international outlook and scientific impact, due to the young age and small size of the school, it tends to rank comparatively low in name-brand surveys. The Times 2017 reputation ranking where EPFL was ranked world 45th, comparatively low for EPFL.

The Times 100 Under 50 Rankings is a ranking of the top 100 universities in the world under 50 years old.

Times Higher Education also ranked EPFL as the most international university in the world two years in a row 2014 and 2015.

Campus 

The École d'ingénieurs de l'Université de Lausanne, from which EPFL in its modern-day form originates, was located in the center of Lausanne. In 1974, five years after EPFL was separated from University of Lausanne and became a federal institute under its current name, the construction of a new campus at Dorigny in Écublens, a suburb south-west of Lausanne on the shores of Lake Geneva, began. The inauguration of the first EPFL buildings of the new campus took place in 1978.

The EPFL campus has been evolving ever since. The first stage of development, with a total budget of 462 million Swiss francs, was completed in 1984; the second in 1990. Construction of the northern parts of campus began in 1995 with the Microtechnology building, completed in 1998, and the architecture building, completed in 2000. In 2002, the department of architecture also moved to the campus in Écublens, uniting all departments of EPFL on the same site. The latest addition to the EPFL campus is the Rolex Learning Center completed February 2010. The Rolex Learning the university includes areas for work, leisure and services and is located at the center of the campus. The campus is now being expanded with the construction of the SwissTech Convention Center inaugurated in March 2014.

Together with the University of Lausanne, also located in Écublens, the EPFL forms a vast campus complex at the shores of Lake Geneva with about 20,000 students, The campus is served by the Lausanne Metro Line 1 (M1) and is equipped with an electric bicycle sharing system. Since 2012, only electricity from certified hydroelectric generation is being bought by EPFL to power its campus. The university was the first campus to receive the International Sustainable Campus Excellence Award by the International Sustainable Campus Network.

Of the 14,000 people that work and study at the École Polytechnique Fédérale de Lausanne campus, roughly 9.300 are students in either Bachelor, Master or Doctoral programs, the remaining 4,700 being administrative staff, scientists, technical staff, professors and the entrepreneurs located in the Science Park EPFL7. More than 125 nationalities are present on campus with 48% of the student population being foreign nationals.

Almost all of the structures are on its main campus. However, it also has branches in Neuchâtel ("Microcity"), in Sion ("Pôle EPFL Valais"), in Geneva (Campus Biotech, including the Wyss Center for Bio- and Neuro-engineering) and in Fribourg ("Smart Living Lab"). There is also a research centre in Ras al-Khaimah (United Arab Emirates), EPFL Middle East.

Buildings 

Built according to the growth of the school, the campus includes different types of architectures:
 Late 1970s–1980s: modularised building, used today by the Schools of Basic Sciences and Architecture, Civil and Environmental Engineering, Mechanical and Electrical Engineering
 1990s: buildings with institutes from the Schools of Engineering Sciences and Techniques, Computer and Communication Sciences, and the Scientific Park (PSE)
 Modern: new buildings (2002–2004) with Microengineering, Communications and Architecture institutes, the School of Life Sciences and the College of Management.
 The Rolex Learning Center, a new library (2010)
 2014: The SwissTech Convention Center and the "Quartier Nord" (convention center, student accommodation, shops...)
 The EPFL-Pavilions building (previously Artlab), designed by Japanese architect Kengo Kuma, was opened in November 2016; it includes three spaces opened to the public. The first one hosts archives from the Montreux Jazz Festival; the second is a space for museum experimentations. The third space, named DataSquare, hosts an exposition on Big data, illustrated by two scientific projects from EPFL: the Human Brain Project and the Venice Time Machine.
Museums: Musée Bolo, Archizoom (EPFL).
 
The EPFL and the University of Lausanne also share an active sports centre five minutes away from EPFL, on the shores of Lake Geneva.

Associated campuses 
Beyond its main campus, EPFL operates a network of associated campuses in Western Switzerland, often sharing these spaces with partner academic institutions and hospitals:
 Fribourg: Smart Living Lab
Neuchâtel: Microcity
 Geneva: Campus Biotech
 Sion: EPFL Valais/Wallis

Language Centre 
The Language Centre offers language and communication modules for French, German, Italian and English (CEFR levels A1 to C2) to enable learners to participate more effectively in academic, professional and social situations in an internationalized multilingual and multicultural context. These modules are reserved for EPFL students, staff members and for their spouses.

Tandems are also organized and set up within the framework of the Tandem Program of the Faculty of Arts/EFLE of the University of Lausanne. This concept includes two people of different first languages meeting regularly to teach each other their respective language.

Students and traditions

Student body 

The number of students attending studying at EPFL has been rising heavily since EPFL was formed in 1969 under its current name. In 1969 EPFL had roughly 1400 students; that number had grown to 2367 by 1982, 4302 by 1997, 9921 students in 2014, and 10,536 students at the end of 2016. Within the student body, 112 different nationalities are represented. In the period from 1982 to 2014 the female proportion of the student body has increased from 12% to 27%. The proportion of female students is lowest at the School of Computer Science and Communication (15%) and highest at the School of Life Sciences (49%).

Associations

The school encourages the formation of associations and sports activities on campus. As of 2012 more than 79 associations exist on campus for recreational and social purposes. In addition, the school has its own monthly newspaper, Flash. Included in the 79 associations are

 AGEPoly is the Student's Association. Its purpose is to represent the EPFL's students, defend the general interests of the students and inform and consult its members on decisions of the EPFL Direction that concern them.
 The Forum is a  student association responsible for organization of the Forum EPFL. The Forum was founded in 1982 as a platform for exchange and meeting between the academic and professional communities. Today, it is one of the largest recruiting events in Europe, and the largest in Switzerland.
 UNIPOLY is the EPFL Association for Ecology, the Association works to create awareness of ecology on campus and in western Switzerland. UNIPOLY is part of the World Student Community for Sustainable Development, an international network of student organizations for sustainable development consisting of EPFL, ETH Zurich, Massachusetts Institute of Technology, University of Tokyo, University of Fort Hare, University of Nairobi, Chalmers, and University of Yaounde.
 The Anime and Manga club, PolyJapan, schedules viewings of seasonal anime on a regular basis.

Music festivals
Several music festivals are held yearly. The largest one is the Balélec Festival, organized in May each year since 1981. The festival welcomes 15,000 visitors to around 30 concerts.

Archimedean Oath
The EPFL was the birthplace of the Archimedean Oath, proposed by students in 1990. The Archimedean Oath has since spread to a number of European engineering schools. The Archimedean Oath is an ethical code of practice for engineers and technicians, similar to the Hippocratic Oath used in the medical world.

Harassment and sexism 
In 2020, the student association Polyquity published numerous testimonies from students via an instagram account @payetonepfl denouncing cases of sexual, homophobic and racist harassment as well as cases of rape within the associations present on campus but also within the teaching staff. The student association denounces serious failings of the institution that is supposed to manage harassment.

EPFL Alumni network 

The mission of EPFL Alumni is to provide graduates of the school an international network and a strong and lasting relationship upon graduation. It offers graduates a directory  of over 30,000 EPFL graduates across the globe with access reserved to alumni. It  provides  opportunities for meeting, training and consulting, and  creates a platform for exchange and services on topics as diverse as career, expatriation, research, entrepreneurship and volunteerism. The alumni group ensures that graduates can benefit from the support of older peers by fostering opportunities to meet in Switzerland or abroad. In 2018, a new initiative was launched for alumni to mentor young graduates and prepare them for the EPFL forum event as well as their first steps in the professional world.

EPFL Alumni has built a strong international network of chapters. They independently offer activities, conferences and outings, with financial and logistical support from EPFL Alumni.

Scientific partners 

 EPFL is the official scientific advisor of Alinghi, twice winners of the America's cup 2003 and 2007.
 Solar Impulse is a Swiss long-range solar powered aircraft project developed at EPFL, the project has now achieved the first circumnavigation of the world using only solar power.
 The Hydroptère, is an experimental sailing hydrofoil that in 2009 broke the world speed sailing record, sustaining a speed of 52.86 knots (97.90 km/h; 60.83 mph) for 500m in 30 knots of wind
 EPFL contributed to the construction of SwissCube-1. It is the first satellite entirely built in Switzerland. It was put into orbit on 23 September 2009 by the Indian launcher PSLV.
 To better understand the relationship between nutrition and the brain, EPFL and the Nestlé research center has signed a five-year agreement providing 5 million CHF each year for the creation of two new chairs at the EPFL Brain Mind Institute.
 Logitech and EPFL has announced the creation of the EPFL Logitech Incubator that will provide financial, educational and operational support in entrepreneurship to researchers and students.
 Breitling Orbiter 3 became the first balloon to circumnavigate the earth non-stop in March 1999. The balloon was piloted by Bertrand Piccard and Brian Jones.
 Solar Impulse 2 completed the first circumnavigation of the Earth by a piloted fixed-wing aircraft using only solar power. The plane was piloted (alternatively) by André Borschberg and Bertrand Piccard.
 The Human Brain Project is the successor of the EPFL Blue Brain Project. The project is directed by EPFL and involves 86 institutions across Europe. The total cost is estimated at 1.190 billion euros.
 EPFL has hosted the UNESCO Chair in Technologies for Development since 2007, where notable papers are presented by experts in the field. In 2014, Mobile Financial Services in Disaster Relief: Modeling Sustainability was presented by technology analyst, David Garrity.

Organization 

EPFL is organised into eight schools, themselves formed of institutes that group research units (laboratories or chairs) around common themes:
 School of Basic Sciences (SB, Paul Joseph Dyson)
 Institute of Mathematics (MATH, Victor Panaretos)
 Institute of Chemical Sciences and Engineering (ISIC, Emsley Lyndon)
 Institute of Physics (IPHYS, Harald Brune)
 European Centre of Atomic and Molecular Computations (CECAM, Ignacio Pagonabarraga Mora)
 Bernoulli Center (CIB, Nicolas Monod)
 Biomedical Imaging Research Center (CIBM, Rolf Gruetter) 
 Interdisciplinary Center for Electron Microscopy (CIME, Cécile Hébert)
 Max Planck-EPFL Centre for Molecular Nanosciences and Technology (CMNT, Thomas Rizzo)
 Swiss Plasma Center (SPC, Ambrogio Fasoli)
 Laboratory of Astrophysics (LASTRO, Jean-Paul Kneib)
 School of Engineering (STI, Ali Sayed)
 Institute of Electrical Engineering (IEL, Giovanni De Micheli)
 Institute of Mechanical Engineering (IGM, Thomas Gmür)
 Institute of Materials (IMX, Michaud Véronique)
 Institute of Microengineering (IMT, Olivier Martin)
 Institute of Bioengineering (IBI, Matthias Lütolf)
 School of Architecture, Civil and Environmental Engineering (ENAC, Claudia R. Binder)
 Institute of Architecture
 Civil Engineering Institute
 Environmental Engineering Institute
 School of Computer and Communication Sciences (IC, Rüdiger Urbanke)
 Algorithms & Theoretical Computer Science
 Artificial Intelligence & Machine Learning
 Computational Biology
 Computer Architecture & Integrated Systems
 Data Management & Information Retrieval
 Graphics & Vision
 Human-Computer Interaction
 Information & Communication Theory
 Networking
 Programming Languages & Formal Methods
 Security & Cryptography
 Signal & Image Processing
 Systems
 School of Life Sciences (SV, Andrew Oates)
 Bachelor-Master Teaching Section in Life Sciences and Technologies (SSV)
 Brain Mind Institute (BMI, Carmen Sandi)
 Institute of Bioengineering (IBI, Melody Swartz)
 Swiss Institute for Experimental Cancer Research (ISREC, Douglas Hanahan)
 Global Health Institute (GHI, Bruno Lemaitre)
 Ten Technology Platforms & Core Facilities (PTECH)
 Center for Phenogenomics (CPG)
 NCCR Synaptic Bases of Mental Diseases (NCCR-SYNAPSY)
 College of Management of Technology (CDM)
 Swiss Finance Institute at EPFL (CDM-SFI, Damir Filipovic)
 Section of Management of Technology and Entrepreneurship (CDM-PMTE, Daniel Kuhn)
 Institute of Technology and Public Policy (CDM-ITPP, Matthias Finger)
 Institute of Management of Technology and Entrepreneurship (CDM-MTEI, Ralf Seifert)
 Section of Financial Engineering (CDM-IF, Julien Hugonnier)
 College of Humanities (CDH, Thomas David)
 Human and social sciences teaching program (CDH-SHS, Thomas David)
 EPFL Middle East (EME, Dr. Franco Vigliotti)
 Section of Energy Management and Sustainability (MES, Prof. Maher Kayal)

In addition to the eight schools there are seven closely related institutions

 Swiss Cancer Centre
 Center for Biomedical Imaging (CIBM)
 Centre for Advanced Modelling Science (CADMOS)
 École cantonale d'art de Lausanne (ECAL)
 Campus Biotech
 Wyss Center for Bio- and Neuro-engineering
 Swiss National Supercomputing Centre

Notable people

Presidents 

The school had directors from 1853 to 1969. In 1969, the school was separated from the rest of the University of Lausanne and became a federal institute. The presidents are:
 Maurice Cosandey (1969–1978)
 Bernard Vittoz (1978–1992)
 Jean-Claude Badoux (1992–2000)
 Patrick Aebischer (2000–2016)
 Martin Vetterli (2017–)

Professors

Alumni 

 Guy Berruyer (chief executive of Sage Group)
 Mattia Binotto (team principal of Scuderia Ferrari)
 Aart de Geus (chairman, founder and CEO of Synopsys)
 George de Mestral (electrical engineer, inventor of Velcro)
 Eric Favre (inventor of Nespresso, the first single-serve coffee container)
 André Gorz (Austrian-French philosopher and economist)
 Daniel Borel (co-founder of Logitech)
 Franck Riboud (CEO of Danone)
 André Kudelski (CEO of Kudelski)
 Jean-Daniel Nicoud (Swiss computer scientist)
 Othman Benjelloun (Moroccan businessman)
 Daniel Brélaz (Swiss Mathematician, Politician and Environmentalist)
 Stefan Kudelski (Industrialist, inventor of the Nagra)
 Luc Recordon (Swiss politician)
 André Borschberg (businessman and pilot, founder of the Solar Impulse project)
 Jacques Dubochet (winner of the 2017 Nobel Prize in Chemistry)
 Guillaume Pousaz (founder of Checkout.com)
 Alexandra Ros (German analytical chemist)

Gallery

Buildings and campus

Projects and partnerships 

 Human Brain Project: a large 10-year scientific research project, established in 2013, coordinated by Prof. Henry Markram (EPFL) and largely funded by the European Union. It aims to provide a collaborative informatics infrastructure and first draft rodent and human whole brain models within its 10-year funding period. It includes 112 research partners in 24 countries in Europe as well as outside Europe.

See also 
 Science and technology in Switzerland
 Swiss Electromagnetics Research and Engineering Centre
 Top Industrial Managers for Europe
 Green building on college campuses
 Technologist, magazine published by EuroTech Universities Alliance

Notes and references

Bibliography 
  Histoire de l'École polytechnique de Lausanne : 1953-1978, Presses polytechniques et universitaires romandes, 1999.
  Michel Pont, Chronique de l'EPFL 1978-2000, Presses polytechniques et universitaires romandes, 2010.
  Libero Zuppiroli, La bulle universitaire. Faut-il poursuivre le rêve américain ? [The academic bubble. Should we pursue the American dream?], Éditions d'en bas, 2010, 176 pages. The first part, entitled "Le parcours exemplaire du Swiss Institute of Technology Lausanne" [The exemplary path of the Swiss Institute of Technology in Lausanne], is about the change of the EPFL after the appointment of Patrick Aebischer as president.

External links 

 
 , 
 EPFL virtual tour
 EPFL innovation park
 Balélec Festival

 
ETH Domain
Technical universities and colleges in Switzerland
Educational institutions established in 1853
Architecture schools in Switzerland
Buildings and structures in Lausanne
Engineering universities and colleges in Switzerland
1853 establishments in Switzerland
Schools in Lausanne